Torzhkovo is a rural locality (a village) in Lavrovskoye Rural Settlement, Sudogodsky District, Vladimir Oblast, Russia. The population was 6 as of 2010.

Geography 
Torzhkovo is located on the Voyninga River, 18 km northwest of Sudogda (the district's administrative centre) by road. Sukhovka is the nearest rural locality.

References 

Rural localities in Sudogodsky District